Qarah Tikan (also Romanized as Qarah Tīkān, Qareh Tīkān, and Qareh Tīgān; also known as Qarātigān, Qareh Tekān, and Shahīd Eslām Tūḵalī) is a village in Zavin Rural District, Zavin District, Kalat County, Razavi Khorasan Province, Iran. At the 2006 census, its population was 282, in 85 families.

References 

Populated places in Kalat County